Hypochondriac may refer to:
Hypochondriac (The Frights album), 2018
Hypochondriac (Brakence album), 2022
"Hypochondriac", a 2020 song by Fenne Lily

Other uses
 Hypochondriasis, a condition in which a person is excessively and unduly worried about having a serious illness.
Hypochondrium, an anatomical term referring to regions in the upper third of the abdomen